Trabue is a name, possibly derived from tribus an Old French word for "tribe". It may refer to the following:

Name

Surname 
Charles Clay Trabue (1798–1851), American politician, bankers and a former mayor of Nashville, Tennessee
Daniel Trabue, first settler of Columbia, Kentucky
Isaac Trabue, lawyer and attempted namesake of Punta Gorda, Florida
Colonel Robert P. Trabue, of the American Confederate Army
Russell Trabue (1900–1988), American baseball pitcher in the Negro league

Middle name 
William Trabue Major (1790–1867), American religious leader
Margaret Trabue Hodgen (1890–1977), American sociologist and author

Other uses 
Daniel Trabue House, Columbia, Kentucky